Islam Abdel Ghani (born June 6, 1991) is an Egyptian professional footballer who currently plays as a centre-back for the Egyptian club ZED FC.

References

1991 births
Living people
El Raja SC players
Egyptian footballers
Association football defenders